Norwood is a neighborhood in Knoxville, Tennessee. It is located in an area north and west of Interstate 75, north of Interstate 640, east of Western Avenue, and south of Schaad Road and Callahan Drive.

Its ZIP codes are 37912 and 37921.

References
City-data.com profile of Norwood neighborhood in Knoxville, TN.

Neighborhoods in Knoxville, Tennessee